William Forest Crouch (January 16, 1904 – March, 1968) was an American director and writer of film, mostly shorts. His work includes Reet, Petite, and Gone (1947) made with an all-African-American cast. He was active during the 1940s.

He was born in Boone, Iowa, with most of his family emigrating to Australia in the early 1960s, incentivised by the Australian government, who were optimistic about the emerging film industry. In Australia at the time, there was an undercurrent of racism that Crouch had to overcome as half of an interracial couple with children.

Crouch and his family escaped the cold of Australia's Southern region by spending William's final years in the Northern New South Wales and Gold Coast region with their large extended family of grandchildren.

Filmography
Baby Don't Go Away from Me (1943)
Cats Can't Dance (1945)
Caldonia (1945)
Dinty McGinty (1946)
Back Door Man (1946)
Happy Cat (1946) - Featuring Dardanelle and Her Boys
Reet, Petite, and Gone (1947)

References

External links
 

1904 births
1968 deaths
American film directors
African-American film directors
African-American screenwriters
American male screenwriters
20th-century American male writers
20th-century American screenwriters
20th-century African-American writers
African-American male writers